Kimberly Jaraj (born 1986 in London) is a British actress.

Filmography
 I Can't Think Straight (2007)
 The Run (2008)
 Iron Cross (2010)
 Riding the Pine (2011)
 Airborne (2012)

References

External links
 Sandra Reynolds
 

1986 births
English film actresses
Living people
Actresses from London